Safe Harbour (also known as Danielle Steel's Safe Harbour) is a 2007 American direct-to-video romantic drama film directed by Bill Corcoran, based upon the 2003 novel of the same name by Danielle Steel.

Plot 
Pip was once a normal 11-year-old kid with a happy life, but she became very lonely when her father and brother died at a plane crash. Her mother, Ophelia, has trouble dealing with the loss and becomes depressed. While walking on the beach one day, Pip meets Matt, an artist with a broken heart. She immediately befriends him. Her mother worries about her friendship and suspects Matt of being a pedophile. However, it doesn't take long before Matt wins over Ophelia's heart as well.

Cast
Melissa Gilbert as Ophelia
Brad Johnson as Matt Bowles
Liana Liberato as Pip Mackenzie
Rebecca Staab as Andrea Wilson
Idalis DeLeon as Millie
Michael Jace as Jeff
Kate Vernon as Sally

External links

2007 direct-to-video films
2007 films
2000s English-language films
2007 romantic drama films
Films directed by Bill Corcoran
American romantic drama films
Films based on works by Danielle Steel
Films based on American novels
2000s American films